Phyllobacterium catacumbae is a Gram-negative, aerobic, motile bacteria with a polar tuft of flagella in the genus Phyllobacterium. It was isolated from the tuff (a type of rock) walls of Saint Callixtus' catacomb in Rome, Italy.

References

External links
Type strain of Phyllobacterium catacumbae at BacDive -  the Bacterial Diversity Metadatabase

Phyllobacteriaceae
Bacteria described in 2005